Santa Ynez Valley Cottage Hospital is a hospital in the city of Solvang, California.  It is owned and operated by Cottage Health.

The hospital was featured briefly in a scene of the 2004 film  Sideways.

Reference List

External links 
 Santa Ynez Valley Cottage Hospital
This hospital in the CA Healthcare Atlas A project by OSHPD
 Cottage Health

Hospitals in Santa Barbara County, California
Cottage hospitals
Santa Ynez Valley
Solvang, California
Hospital buildings completed in 1964
1964 establishments in California